Bulletin of the Russian Academy of Sciences: Physics is a translation of the Russian peer-reviewed scientific journal Известия РАН. Серия физическая (Izvestiya Rossiiskoi Akademii Nauk, Seriya Fizicheskaya) that was established in 1936 as the Bulletin of the Academy of Sciences of USSR: Physics Series, obtaining its current title in 1992. The journal publishes exclusively the transactions of various Russian Academy of Sciences events in the  field of physics in its widest sense. Previous editors-in-chief included Sergey_Ivanovich_Vavilov, Abram_Ioffe, A.A. Lebedev, B.S. Djelepov, A.V. Gaponov-Grekhov, and F.V. Bunkin. The current editor-in-chief is Dmitry R. Khokhlov (Lomonosov Moscow State University). Originally the journal was translated into French, switching to English in 1974. Until 2008 it was published by Allerton Press and since then by Pleiades Publishing in collaboration with Springer Science+Business Media.

Abstracting and indexing
The journal is abstracted and indexed in:
Astrophysics Data System
Chemical Abstracts Service
EBSCO databases
Ei Compendex
Inspec
ProQuest databases
Scopus
Zentralblatt Math

References

External links

 Physics journals
 English-language journals
Russian Academy of Sciences academic journals
Publications established in 1936
Monthly journals